Listen is the first full-length album from Brooklyn-based symphonic rock band Emanuel and the Fear and was released via Paper Garden in March 2010.

Critical reception
Regarding Emanuel and the Fear's first full-length record, The 405 wrote: "The haunting mish-mash of psychedelia, poetic lyrics, pop and post-rock is tremendously put together and while a little overblown at times, it never gets in the way of the clarity of any song. Mixing The National's sentimentality with the integrity of Eels, a dedicated cult following already awaits."

Track listing
 The Introduction 02:12
 Guatemala 03:38
 Ariel and the River 05:25
 Jimme's Song (Full Band Version) 05:24
 Duckies 00:16
 Free Life 03:52
 Dear Friend 04:18
 Yo, Jamin 00:31
 Trucker Lovesong 05:40
 Balcony 06:44
 Whatever You Do 04:08
 Bridges and Ladies 00:16
 The Raimin 05:13
 Same Way 03:32
 Simple Eyes 04:03
 Song For a Girl 03:34
 The Finale 05:47
 Look Ma, The Walls Are Moving 00:23
 Razzmatazz 03:49

References

2010 debut albums
Emanuel and the Fear albums